Freddy Krueger is a fictional character and the primary antagonist in the A Nightmare on Elm Street film series. He was created by Wes Craven and made his debut in Craven's A Nightmare on Elm Street (1984) as the malevolent spirit of a child killer who had been burned to death by his victims' parents after evading prison. Krueger goes on to murder his victims in their dreams, causing their deaths in the real world as well. In the dream world, he is a powerful force and seemingly invulnerable. However, whenever Freddy is pulled back into the real world, he has normal human vulnerabilities and can be destroyed. He is commonly identified by his burned, disfigured face, dirty red-and-green-striped sweater and brown fedora, and trademark metal-clawed, brown leather, right hand glove. This glove was the product of Krueger's own imagination, having welded the blades himself before using it to murder many of his victims, both in the real and dream worlds. Over the course of the film series, Freddy has battled several reoccurring survivors including Nancy Thompson and Alice Johnson. The character was consistently portrayed by Robert Englund in the original film series as well as in the television spin-off Freddy's Nightmares. Englund has stated that he feels the character represents neglect, particularly that suffered by children. The character also more broadly represents subconscious fears.

The character quickly became a pop culture icon going on to appear in toy lines, comic books, books, sneakers, costumes, and video games since his debut. In 2003, Krueger appeared alongside fellow horror icon Jason Voorhees in Freddy vs. Jason. In 2010, a reboot of the film, starring Jackie Earle Haley, was released.

Wizard magazine rated Freddy the 14th-greatest villain of all time; the British television channel Sky2 listed him 8th, and the American Film Institute ranked him 40th on its "AFI's 100 Years...100 Heroes & Villains" list. In 2010, Freddy was nominated for the award for Best Villain (formerly Most Vile Villain) at the Scream Awards.

Appearances

Film
In A Nightmare on Elm Street, Freddy is introduced as a serial child killer from the fictitious town of Springwood, Ohio, who kills his victims with a bladed leather glove he crafted in a boiler room where he used to take his 20 victims. He is captured, but is set free on a technicality when it is discovered that the search warrant was not signed in the right place. He is hunted down by a mob made up of the town's vengeful parents and cornered in the boiler room. The mob douses the building with gasoline and sets it on fire by throwing Molotov cocktails, burning him alive. While his body dies, his spirit lives on within the dreams of a group of teenagers and pre-adolescents living on Elm Street, whom he preys on by entering their dreams and killing them, fueled by the town's memories and fear of him and empowered by a trio of 'dream demons' to be their willing instrument of evil. He is apparently destroyed at the end of the film by protagonist Nancy Thompson (Heather Langenkamp), but the last scene reveals that he has survived. He goes on to antagonize the teenage protagonists of the film's sequels, including Jesse Walsh (Mark Patton), Kristen Parker (Patricia Arquette), Alice Johnson (Lisa Wilcox), and Lori Campbell (Monica Keena).

In A Nightmare on Elm Street 3: Dream Warriors, more of Freddy's backstory is revealed by the mysterious nun who repeatedly appears to Dr. Neil Gordon (Craig Wasson). Freddy's mother, Amanda Krueger (Nan Martin), was a nurse at the asylum featured in the film. At the time she worked there, a largely abandoned, run-down wing of the asylum was used to lock up entire hordes of the most insane criminals all at once. When Amanda was young, she was accidentally locked into the room with the criminals over a holiday weekend. They managed to keep her hidden for days, raping her repeatedly. When she was finally discovered, she was barely alive and pregnant, with the result that Krueger was regarded as "the bastard son of a hundred maniacs" due to it being impossible to determine which of the rapists was his biological father. However, in A Nightmare on Elm Street 5: The Dream Child, it is implied that Freddy had identified which one of them was his birth father (also portrayed by Englund in a dream sequence) and hates his mother for rejecting him. Later, in Freddy's Dead: The Final Nightmare, it is revealed that he was adopted by an alcoholic named Mr. Underwood (Alice Cooper), who abused him throughout his childhood until Freddy finally murdered him as a teenager. Freddy tortures animals and engages in self-mutilation, and becomes a serial killer by murdering the children of people who had bullied him when he was a child. Prior to his murder, he is married to a woman named Loretta (Lindsey Fields), whom he eventually also murders. He also has a daughter, Katherine (Lisa Zane), who seeks to end her father's horrific legacy once and for all, killing him at the end of the movie.

After a hiatus following the release of The Final Nightmare, Krueger was brought back in Wes Craven's New Nightmare by Wes Craven, who had not worked on the film series since the third film, Dream Warriors. New Nightmare coincides with the approaching anniversary of the release of the first film. Robert Englund, who portrayed Krueger throughout the film series and its television spin-off, also took the role as a fictional version of himself in New Nightmare; it is implied that Englund was stalked by his character, who is an ancient demonic entity that took on the form of Wes Craven's creation and has come to life from the film franchise's fictitious world. Having been in various manifestations throughout the ages due to the entity can be captured through storytelling, it is hinted that it was once in the form of the old witch from Brothers Grimm's fairy tale Hansel and Gretel when it was held prisoner in this allegory. Englund describes to his former co-star and friend Heather Langenkamp that this embodiment of Freddy is darker and more evil than as portrayed by him in the films; he struggles to keep his sanity intact from Krueger's torments and goes into hiding with his family. Krueger aims to stop another film of the franchise from being made, eliminating the films' crew members, including Langenkamp's husband, Chase Porter (David Newsom), after stealing a prototype bladed glove from him, and causes nightmares and makes threatening phone calls to producer Robert Shaye. The entity also haunts Wes Craven's dreams, to the point that he sees future events related to Krueger's actions and then writes them down as a movie script. Krueger sees Langenkamp as his primary foe because her character Nancy Thompson was the first to defeat him. Krueger's attempts to cross over to reality cause a series of earthquakes throughout Los Angeles County, including the 1994 Northridge earthquake. Langenkamp, with help from her son Dylan (Miko Hughes), succeeds in defeating the entity and apparently destroys him; however, Krueger's creator reveals that it is again imprisoned in the fictitious world, indicated by the character's later appearances in films and other medias.

In 2003, Freddy battled fellow horror icon Jason Voorhees (Ken Kirzinger) from the Friday the 13th film series in the theatrical release Freddy vs. Jason, a film which officially resurrected both characters from their respective deaths and subsequently sent them to Hell. As the film begins, Krueger is frustrated at his current inability to kill as knowledge of him has been hidden in Springwood, prompting him to manipulate Jason into killing in his place in the hope that the resulting fear will remind others of him so that he can resume his own murder spree. However, Freddy's plan proves too effective when Jason starts killing people before Freddy can do it, culminating in a group of teens learning the truth and drawing Freddy and Jason to Camp Crystal Lake in the hope that they can draw Freddy into the real world so that Jason will kill him and remain "home." The ending of the film is left ambiguous as to whether or not Freddy is actually dead; despite being decapitated, when Jason emerges from the lake carrying his head he looks and winks at the audience. A sequel featuring Ash Williams (Bruce Campbell) from the Evil Dead franchise was planned, but never materialized onscreen. It was later turned into Dynamite Entertainment's comic book series Freddy vs. Jason vs. Ash.

In the  2010 remake of the original film, Freddy's backstory is that he was a groundskeeper at Springfield Badham Preschool who tortured and sexually abused the teenage protagonists of the film when they were children. When their parents found out, they trapped him in a boiler room at an industrial park and set it on fire with a Molotov cocktail made out of a gasoline canister, killing him. As a spirit, he takes his revenge on the teenagers by haunting their dreams; he is particularly obsessed with Nancy Holbrook (Rooney Mara), who had been his “favorite” when she was a child. Krueger's power comes from his prey's memories and emotions upon remembering the abuse they suffered at his hands. His bladed glove is made out of discarded pieces of his gardening tools. Nancy destroys him at the end of the film by pulling his spirit into the physical world and cutting his throat; the final scene reveals that Freddy's spirit has survived, however.

Television
Englund continued to portray Krueger in the 1988 television anthology series, Freddy's Nightmares. The show was hosted by Freddy, who did not take direct part in most of the episodes, but he did show up occasionally to influence the plot of particular episodes. Further, a consistent theme in each episode was characters having disturbing dreams. The series ran for 44 episodes over two seasons, ending on March 10, 1990. Although a bulk of the episodes did not feature Freddy taking a major role in the plot, the pilot episode, "No More, Mr. Nice Guy", depicts the events of his trial, and his subsequent death at the hands of the parents of Elm Street after his acquittal. In "No More, Mr. Nice Guy", though Freddy's case seems open and shut, a mistrial is declared based on the arresting officer, Lt. Tim Blocker (Ian Patrick Williams), not reading Krueger his Miranda rights, which is different from the original Nightmare, which stated he was released because someone forgot to sign the search warrant in the right place. The episode also reveals that Krueger used an ice cream van to lure children close enough so that he could kidnap and kill them. After the town's parents burn Freddy to death he returns to haunt Blocker in his dreams. Freddy gets his revenge when Blocker is put under anesthesia at the dentist's office, and Freddy shows up and kills him. The episode "Sister's Keeper" was a "sequel" to this episode, even though it was the seventh episode of the series. The episode follows Krueger as he terrorizes Blocker's identical twin daughters and frames one sister for the other's murder. Season two's "It's My Party And You'll Die If I Want You To" featured Freddy attacking a high school prom date who stood him up 20 years earlier. He gets his revenge with his desire being fulfilled in the process.

Characterization
Wes Craven said his inspiration for the basis of Freddy Krueger's power stemmed from several stories in the Los Angeles Times about a series of mysterious deaths: All the victims had reported recurring nightmares and died in their sleep. Additionally, Craven's original script characterized Freddy as a child molester, which Craven said was the "worst thing" he could think of. The decision was made to instead make him a child murderer in order to avoid being accused of exploiting the spate of highly publicized child molestation cases in California around the time A Nightmare on Elm Street went into production. Craven's inspirations for the character included a bully from his school during his youth, a disfigured homeless man who had frightened him when he was 12, and the 1970s pop song "Dream Weaver" by Gary Wright. In an interview, he said of the disfigured stranger, "When I looked down there was a man very much like Freddy walking along the sidewalk. He must have sensed that someone was looking at him and stopped and looked right into my face. He scared the living daylights out of me, so I jumped back into the shadows. I waited and waited to hear him walk away. Finally I thought he must have gone, so I stepped back to the window. The guy was not only still looking at me but he thrust his head forward as if to say, 'Yes, I'm still looking at you.' The man walked towards the apartment building's entrance. I ran through the apartment to our front door as he was walking into our building on the lower floor. I heard him starting up the stairs. My brother, who is ten years older than me, got a baseball bat and went out to the corridor but he was gone."

Throughout the series, Freddy's potential victims often experience dreams of young children, jumping rope and chanting a rhyme to the tune of "One, Two, Buckle My Shoe" with the lyrics changed to "One, Two, Freddy's coming for you", often as an omen to Freddy's presence or a precursor to his attacks. The children are often heavily implied to be the spirits of his past victims prior to his death.  More of Freddy's backstory is shown in A Nightmare on Elm Street 3: Dream Warriors, revealing him to have been an unwanted child of rape, being the son of Sister Amanda Krueger, a nun who was violently raped by dozens of inmates from a mental asylum, eventually dubbed and constantly mocked as the "bastard son of a hundred maniacs". In Freddy's Dead: The Final Nightmare, it's shown that since a young age, Freddy displayed murderous tendencies and a penchant for self-harm, even displaying masochistic traits as he was beat as a teenager by his guardian Mr. Underwood. Robert Englund has stated that the character represents the neglect of children and the damaging results it can produce. 

In Wes Craven's New Nightmare, Freddy is characterized as a symbol of something powerful and ancient and is given more stature and muscles. Unlike the six movies before it, New Nightmare shows Freddy as closer to what Wes Craven originally intended, toning down his comedic side while strengthening the more menacing aspects of his character.

In the 2010 remake, Krueger is depicted as a sadistic pedophile (as per Craven's original vision), who worked as a gardener at a local preschool. Unlike in the original series where he was a known child-killer who evaded conviction on a technicality, there was actually ambiguity about Krueger's guilt or innocence apart from the testimony of his victims. His guilt is confirmed once the grown survivors find the room where Krueger molested them.

Appearance

According to Robert Englund, Freddy's look was based on Klaus Kinski's portrayal of Count Dracula in Nosferatu the Vampyre (1979) and some of the works of Lon Chaney, while he based Freddy's poise and gait on the "Cagney stance" originated by actor James Cagney. Freddy's characteristic of keeping his gloved arm lower than the other was incidental due to the knives being heavy to wear for Englund and forcing him to carry himself as such while playing the role. Freddy's physical appearance has stayed largely consistent throughout the film series, although small changes were made in subsequent films. He wears a striped red-and-green sweater (solid red sleeves in the original film), a dark brown fedora, his bladed glove, loose black trousers (brown in the original film), and worn work boots, in keeping with his blue collar background. His skin is scarred and burned as a result of being burned alive by the parents of Springwood, and he has no hair at all on his head as it presumably all burned off. In the original film, only Freddy's face was burned, while the scars have spread to the rest of his body from the second film onwards. His blood is occasionally a dark, oily color, or greenish in hue when he is in the Dreamworld. In the original film, Freddy remains in the shadows and under lower light much longer than he does in the later pictures. In the second film, there are some scenes where Freddy is shown without his bladed glove, and instead with the blades protruding from the tips of his fingers. As the films began to emphasize the comedic, wise-cracking aspect of the character, he began to don various costumes and take on other forms, such as dressing as a waiter or wearing a Superman-inspired version of his sweater with a cape (The Dream Child), appearing as a video game sprite (Freddy's Dead), a giant snake-like creature (Dream Warriors), and a hookah-smoking caterpillar (Freddy vs. Jason).

In New Nightmare, Freddy's appearance is updated considerably, giving him a green fedora that matches his sweater stripes, skin-tight leather pants, knee-high black boots, a turtleneck version of his trademark sweater, a blue-black trench coat, and a fifth claw on his glove, which also has a far more organic appearance, resembling the exposed muscle tissue of an actual hand. Freddy also has fewer burns on his face, though these are more severe, with his muscle tissue exposed in numerous places. Compared to his other incarnations, these Freddy's injuries are more like those of an actual burn victim. For the 2010 remake, Freddy is returned to his iconic attire, but the burns on his face are intensified with further bleaching of the skin and exposed facial tissue on the left cheek, more reminiscent of actual third-degree burns than in the original series.

Bladed glove

Wes Craven stated that part of the inspiration for Freddy's infamous bladed glove was from his cat, as he watched it claw the side of his couch one night.

In an interview he said, "Part of it was an objective goal to make the character memorable, since it seems that every character that has been successful has had some kind of unique weapon, whether it be a chain saw or a machete, etc. I was also looking for a primal fear which is embedded in the subconscious of people of all cultures. One of those is the fear of teeth being broken, which I used in my first film. Another is the claw of an animal, like a saber-toothed tiger reaching with its tremendous hooks. I transposed this into a human hand. The original script had the blades being fishing knives."

When Jim Doyle, the creator of Freddy's claw, asked Craven what he wanted, Craven responded, "It's kind of like really long fingernails, I want the glove to look like something that someone could make who has the skills of a boilermaker." Doyle explained, "Then we hunted around for knives. We picked out this bizarre-looking steak knife, we thought that this looked really cool, we thought it would look even cooler if we turned it over and used it upside down. We had to remove the back edge and put another edge on it, because we were actually using the knife upside down." Later Doyle had three duplicates of the glove made, two of which were used as stunt gloves in long shots.

For New Nightmare, Lou Carlucci, the effects coordinator, remodeled Freddy's glove for a more "organic look". He says, "I did the original glove on the first Nightmare and we deliberately made that rough and primitive looking, like something that would be constructed in somebody's home workshop. Since this is supposed to be a new look for Freddy, Craven and everybody involved decided that the glove should be different. This hand has more muscle and bone texture to it, the blades are shinier and in one case, are retractable. Everything about this glove has a much cleaner look to it, it's more a natural part of his hand than a glove." The new glove has five claws.

In the 2010 remake, the glove is redesigned as a metal gauntlet with four finger bars, but it is patterned after its original design. Owing to this iteration of the character's origin as a groundskeeper, from the outset it was a gardener's glove modified as an instrument of torture, and in film its blades was based on a garden fork.

Freddy's glove appeared in the 1987 horror-comedy Evil Dead II above the door on the inside of a toolshed. This was Sam Raimi's response to Wes Craven showing footage of The Evil Dead in A Nightmare on Elm Street, which was a response to Raimi putting a poster of Craven's 1977 film The Hills Have Eyes in The Evil Dead. This, in turn, was a response to a ripped-up Jaws poster in The Hills Have Eyes. The glove also appears in the 1998 horror-comedy Bride of Chucky in an evidence locker room that also contains the remains of the film's villain Chucky, the chainsaw of Leatherface from The Texas Chainsaw Massacre, and the masks of Michael Myers from Halloween and Jason Voorhees from Friday the 13th.

At the end of the film Jason Goes to Hell: The Final Friday, the mask of the title character, Jason Voorhees, played by Kane Hodder, is dragged under the earth by Freddy's gloved hand. Freddy's gloved hand, in the ending, was played by Hodder.

In popular culture

Amusement parks 
At Six Flags St. Louis' Fright Fest event (then known as Fright Nights), Krueger was the main character for the event's first year in 1988. He reappeared in his own haunted house, Freddy's Nightmare: The Haunted House on Elm Street, for the following two years. Freddy Krueger appeared alongside Jason Voorhees and Leatherface as minor icons during Halloween Horror Nights 17 and again with Jason during Halloween Horror Nights 25 at Universal Orlando Resort and Universal Studios Hollywood. In 2016, Freddy Krueger returned to Halloween Horror Nights, along with Jason, in Hollywood.

Miscellaneous
Freddy Krueger made different appearances in Robot Chicken voiced by Seth Green. In the episode "That Hurts Me", Freddy appears as a housemate of "Horror Movie Big Brother", alongside other famous slasher movie killers such as Michael Myers, Jason Voorhees, Leatherface, Pinhead and Ghostface. In the Treehouse of Horror VI segment "A Nightmare on Evergreen Terrace", Groundskeeper Willie played the Freddy Krueger role, with his backstory being toned down to him accidentally setting himself on fire thanks to Homer turning up the boiler and burning to death due to the parents ignoring his pleas for help, deciding to avenge himself by targeting their kids for their callously letting him burn to death. Krueger ultimately was stopped by Maggie plugging his bagpipe spider form, causing him to uncontrollably inflate and detonate within the dream world, though it is implied in the ending this resulted in him being restored to life in reality, albeit significantly less threatening.

Freddy's first video game appearance was in the 1989 NES game A Nightmare on Elm Street. The game was published by LJN Toys and developed by Rare. Freddy Krueger appeared as a downloadable playable character for Mortal Kombat (2011), with Robert Englund reprising his role. He has become the second non-Mortal Kombat character to appear in the game. The game depicts Krueger as a malevolent spirit inhabiting the Dream Realm who attacks Shao Kahn for "stealing" the souls of his potential victims. During the fight, he is pulled into the game's fictional depiction of the real world. The injured Krueger arms himself with two razor claws to continue to battle Kahn. Upon defeating him, Krueger is sent back to the Dream Realm by Nightwolf, where he continues to haunt the dreams of his human prey. In an interview with PlayStation.Blog, Mortal Kombat co-creator Ed Boon cited the character's violent nature and iconic status as reasoning for the inclusion in the game, "Over the years, we've certainly had a number of conversations about guest characters. At one point, we had a conversation about having a group—imagine Freddy, Jason, Michael Myers, Leatherface from The Texas Chain Saw Massacre. We never got a grip on how we would do it, whether they'd be DLC characters or what. We also wanted to introduce a character who was unexpected. This DLC thing opens the doors to realising these ideas." Krueger went on to become playable in the mobile edition of the game's sequel, Mortal Kombat X, alongside Jason from Friday the 13th.

In October 2017, the Jackie Earle Haley incarnation of Krueger was released as a downloadable playable character in the seventh chapter of the asymmetric survival horror game Dead by Daylight, alongside Quentin Smith. The events of the chapter are set immediately following Nancy Holbrook's escape from Krueger, after which he targets Quentin Smith as revenge for aiding her. Invading Smith's dreams, he forces him to go to the Badham Preschool, where the two are unwittingly taken to the universe of Dead by Daylight by an unseen force.

The character returned to television in an episode of The Goldbergs titled "Mister Knifey-Hands" with Englund reprising his role in a cameo. Freddy Krueger appears as an OASIS avatar in Ready Player One. He is among the avatars seen on the PVP location Planet Doom where he is shot by Aech.

The frog species Lepidobatrachus laevis had been given multiple nicknames, one of which is the "Freddy Krueger frog" for its aggressive nature.

References

A Nightmare on Elm Street (franchise) characters
Adoptee characters in films
Fictional serial killers
Fictional characters from Ohio
Film characters introduced in 1984
Fictional factory workers
Fictional ghosts
Fictional mass murderers
Fictional pedophiles
Fictional monsters
Fictional melee weapons practitioners
Fictional offspring of rape
Fictional rapists
Fictional janitors
Fictional victims of domestic abuse
Fictional demons and devils
Fictional characters with death or rebirth abilities
Fictional soul collectors
Fictional characters with superhuman strength
Fictional characters with spirit possession or body swapping abilities
Fictional characters with dream manipulation abilities
Fictional stalkers
Fictional shapeshifters
Fictional telepaths
Male horror film villains
Characters created by Wes Craven
Fictional characters with disfigurements

Fictional uxoricides
Fictional child abusers
Fictional murderers of children
Fictional horticulturists and gardeners
Fictional kidnappers
Orphan characters in film
Fictional torturers
Fictional murdered people
Self-harm in fiction
Slasher film antagonists
Film supervillains
Fictional German American people
Undead supervillains